Buddha Rock is a rock,  high, lying  west of Vindication Island in the South Sandwich Islands. It was charted and named in 1930 by Discovery Investigations personnel on the RSS Discovery II.

See also 
Manthal Buddha Rock

References 

Rock formations of South Georgia and the South Sandwich Islands